Deltote deceptoria, the pretty marbled, is a moth of the family Noctuidae. The species was first described by Giovanni Antonio Scopoli in his 1763 Entomologia Carniolica. It is found in southern and central Europe.

Technical description and variation

L. deceptoria Scop, (tineodes Hufn., atratula Schiff.) (52 d). Forewing chalk white; the markings fuscous black, varied with coarse olive and grey scales; a dark patch at base of costa; a central fascia edged by the wavy black inner and outer lines, the latter projecting and dentate beyond cell, and insinuate on submedian fold; orbicular stigma round, white, with olive grey centre, touching inner line; reniform white, with olive grey black-edged lunule, touching outer line; a costal blotch before, and the terminal area throughout beyond the white submarginal line dark; fringe olive grey, with dark middle line, the outer half chequered with pale grey; hindwing fuscous, with dark cellspot and curved whitish outer line. Larva grass-green, paler on dorsum with dark middle line and a white line on each side of the back; lateral stripes yellowish white; head green, with narrow white collar. The wingspan is 23–25 mm. The length of the forewings is 12–13 mm.

Biology
The moth flies from April to July depending on the location.

The larvae feed on various grasses.

References

External links

"09116 Deltote deceptoria (Scopoli, 1763) - Buschrasen-Grasmotteneulchen". Lepiforum e. V. Retrieved 30 September 2020. 
[https://www.vlinderstichting.nl/vlinders/overzicht-vlinders/details-vlinder/bonte-marmeruil "Bonte marmeruil
Deltote deceptoria"]. De Vlinderstichting. Retrieved 30 September 2020. ]

Acontiinae
Moths described in 1763
Moths of Europe
Taxa named by Giovanni Antonio Scopoli